Mamonaheng Mokitimi (born in 1970) is a Lesotho politician currently serving as the President of the Senate of the Kingdom of Lesotho since July 2017.

Mokitimi was born in 1970 at Morija in Maseru district. She worked in the Parliament of Lesotho from 1999 to 2012. She was the Vice President of the Senate of Lesotho from 2012 to 2015. 

She has a bachelor of arts degree from the National University of Lesotho.

References 

Living people
Presidents of the Senate (Lesotho)
Members of the Parliament of Lesotho
1970 births
National University of Lesotho alumni